Study from Innocent X is a 1962 painting by Francis Bacon.  Based on the Portrait of Innocent X by Diego Velázquez, the work depicts a distorted image of the red-robed pope, sitting on a dark red chair on a platform inside a cuboid cage indicated by thin black lines, standing on a light brownish yellow floor with a curved lighter red wall behind.

It measures .

See also
Study of Red Pope 1962. 2nd version 1971

References

1962 paintings
Paintings by Francis Bacon
Portraits of popes